This discography is an incomplete, chronological list of recordings originally released with the name British Symphony Orchestra on the label. The list also includes other recordings which fall outside this strict definition: either because they have been included in discographies of specific conductors (e.g. Walter, Weingartner); or were never publicly released for general sale; or have been re-released as such on CD; or for comparison purposes only.

The discography is arranged into three main sections: 
 The acoustic recordings made in the 1920s with HMV in Hayes, W. London and at Edison Bell in Peckham, SE London. 
 The electrical recordings made by Columbia in the early 1930s in the Methodist Central Hall in Westminster.
 Modern digital recordings.

Background

Acoustic recordings

Raymond Roze recorded four sides with the orchestra he founded, for Edison Bell's Velvet Face label in c. 1919-early 1920.

Adrian Boult made the HMV recordings at Room 1, HMV, Hayes, Middlesex in 1920-1922, and the Velvet Face ones at the Edison Bell studio in Peckham, SW London, in 1923. He became chief conductor of the Birmingham Choir in late 1923, of the Birmingham Symphony Orchestra in 1924, Music Director of the BBC in 1929? and first chief conductor of the BBC Symphony Orchestra in 1930.

Electrical recordings
"Lasciate ogni speranza, voi ch'entrate."

In the early 1930s the Columbia Graphophone Company made a number of recordings, released with "British Symphony Orchestra" on the label. They were made in 1930–1932, mostly in the Methodist Central Hall, Westminster, which was built in 1911 and first used for recording by Columbia in January 1927. Columbia had been making recordings since 1924 with the orchestra of the Royal Philharmonic Society whose shadowy, occasional existence seems to be partially intertwined with that of the "British Symphony Orchestra" of this period, and is discussed here first.

Orchestra of the Royal Philharmonic Society

Since at least the beginning of the 20th century, the orchestra of the Royal Philharmonic Society was a somewhat ad hoc gathering of musicians which was engaged about once a month for an RPS concert under various conductors; from 1924 it also made a few recordings a year, again under different conductors. For recording purposes it was billed as "The Royal Philharmonic Orchestra" on Columbia record labels. The orchestra of this period is sometimes thus—by extension—often referred to as "the RPO" or "the old RPO".

The members, described a "kind of test match team" were hand-picked from the orchestral musicians of London. The players booked for an RPS concert by the Hon. Sec. were expected to attend all rehearsals and the concert (or recording). The § deputy system was at first specifically disallowed, although this rule came to be severely flouted.

From 1916 Sir Thomas Beecham had effectively taken over the running of the Royal Philharmonic Society, which financially was on its last legs, and ran it autocratically until his resignation two years later in 1918. Balfour Gardiner stepped in with a guarantee of £1,200 to allow concerts to continue. The Society was incorporated in 1922 as a "company limited by guarantee and not having a share capital", which allowed it to enter into a recording contract with Columbia for five years in late 1923.

The Columbia Graphophone Company (Columbia UK) made over 40 recordings of the orchestra. Bruno Walter made numerous records with the orchestra from 1924: other conductors included Sir George Henschel, Paul von Klenau and Beecham, Oskar Fried (Tchaikovsky's 6th symphony in 1929) and Felix Weingartner. Venues included the Petty France studios; the Portman Rooms, Baker Street; the marble-lined Scala Theatre, Charlotte Street; and, from 1930, Central Hall, Westminster.

A number of players joined the newly-formed BBC Symphony Orchestra in 1930. The orchestra of the Royal Philharmonic Society was reformed in autumn 1932 as the London Philharmonic Orchestra (LPO), as a permanent ensemble under Beecham and Malcolm Sargent with backing from the Courtauld family. A number of players were also lured away from the LSO, through what the LSO Board regarded as "treachery by Beecham and disloyalty by Sargent." Beecham conducted the LPO's first concert at the Queen's Hall on 7 October 1932 (Carnaval Romain, Brigg Fair, the 'Prague' symphony and Ein Heldenleben) to tumultuous applause.

Deputy system

The standard of orchestral playing in London had been seriously affected for many years by the deputy system, by which orchestral players—if offered a better-paid engagement—could send a substitute to a rehearsal or a concert. When Wood banned the practice in the Queen's Hall orchestra in 1904, forty disgruntled players left en masse to found the LSO. The Honorary Secretary of the Royal Philharmonic Society, John Mewburn Levien, described it thus: "A, whom you want, signs to play at your concert. He sends B (whom you don't mind) to the first rehearsal. B, without your knowledge or consent, sends C to the second rehearsal. Not being able to play at the concert, C sends D, whom you would have paid five shillings to stay away."

By the 1930s the standard of orchestral playing at Society concerts had fallen so much that "it had become a commonplace that "not one in twenty concerts were properly prepared", and critics and audiences were accustomed to making allowances". The frequent changes of players meant that only "a few celebrated batons, except Beecham's, and possibly Wood's were a regular match for prevailing conditions in the orchestra." Arthur Schnabel was so unhappy about a performance of Mozart's A Major concerto K488 which he had given at a Royal Philharmonic Society concert with Basil Cameron that he wrote to The Times on 18 Jan 1930 to explain that the concert had been inadequately rehearsed. Walter J. Turner, the music critic of the New Statesman (25 January 1930) commented that the orchestra were "tired and apathetic", and that Schnabel's gesture to pay for an extra 30 minutes' rehearsal had to be refused since the extensive use of deputies reduced it to a meaningless gesture.

"British Symphony Orchestra" 
"Quot homines, tot sententiae."

From 1930 to 1932, Columbia released fifteen recordings mostly made in the Central Hall with the name "British Symphony Orchestra" on the label: one each conducted by Smyth and Fried; three each by Wood and Weingartner; and seven by Walter. In addition Weingartner recorded Beethoven's 5th symphony with an unnamed ensemble, released in the US only as performed by a "Symphony Orchestra". It has been re-released on CD as being by the "British Symphony Orchestra", but the basis for this is flimsy to non-existent.

The first recording with "British Symphony Orchestra" on the label was of Ethel Smyth conducting the overture to her opera The Wreckers. Her connection with a BSO may appear valid, since Raymond Roze had promoted The Wreckers during his "Opera in English" season in 1909. when the very first BSO under William Sewell was giving concerts in London. In 1919 Roze had formed the second British Symphony Orchestra, which existed as a semi-permanent ensemble until 1923.

The other conductor with perhaps a vague contemporary connection to the earlier BSO formations is Sir Henry Wood, who would have certainly have come across them in the 'old days': but he doesn't appear to have conducted the old orchestra when William Sewell, Harty, or Boult were giving concerts with the BSO. Hamilton Harty conducted concerts with the BSO in 1906 at the Queen's Hall, where Wood conducted his own New Queen's Hall Orchestra. His association with this later "British Symphony Orchestra" may have been somewhat tongue-in-cheek.

Identity
Record producers, reviewers and discographers have puzzled over the identity of the named and unnamed ensembles. It seems fairly clear that it was not Adrian Boult's old orchestra, which hadn't given a concert since 1923. According to George Frow, "this must have been a general pseudonym, since the original name of British Symphony Orchestra was used in 1919 by Raymond Roze, who founded an orchestra to give employment to soldiers returning from the Great War, but this worthy ambition petered out after a season or two, when it foundered through lack of support."

The London Symphony Orchestra had a contract with HMV, and the New Queen's Hall Orchestra was disbanded by Chappell & Co. in 1927, or by 1930. The BBC Symphony Orchestra (BBCSO) was in the process of being formed, and gave its first concert at Queen's Hall under Boult on 22 October 1930. There were few other major London-based permanent symphonic ensembles,  although the Hallé made frequent trips to the capital from Manchester, and made recordings there with Hamilton Harty for Columbia.

One other sizeable orchestra was that of the Royal Philharmonic Society, which was essentially an ad hoc or pickup orchestra engaged by the Hon. Secretary of the Philharmonic Society for about eight concerts a year at Queen's Hall.

A partial clue may lie in the Weingartner recordings of 1931 which haven't received much scrutiny because of their lesser musical content. Although they state "British Symphony Orchestra" on the label, Michael Gray's data shows that it was the Orchestra of the Royal Philharmonic Society under a cover name.

More particularly, there seems to be little discographical basis for the "British Symphony Orchestra" which appears on CD reissues of the recording of Beethoven 5th Symphony with Weingartner in 1932. It was made by an unnamed orchestra at an undisclosed location. It wasn't even issued in Britain because of the faintness of the recording and the variable recording speeds throughout the work.

The very next day after Weingartner recorded Beethoven 5th, Columbia recorded the waltz from Naila by Delibes on an unissued matrix CAX 6358, with the Columbia Symphony named as the performer. This is not at all the first example of the Columbia Symphony Orchestra.

The last recording released with "British Symphony Orchestra" on the label was made by Henry Wood on 16 October 1932, about one week after the LPO (the "old RPO") had given its first concert.

As George Frow commented in 1979: "At this distance it is becoming difficult to break through the defences of the pseudonyms without deep research, and there is a great deal that will one day be done by somebody, not only on early individual performers, singers and comedians in particular, but orchestras, as has been shown".

Summary
The painstaking work carried out by, for example, Robert Marsh on his Bruno Walter discography , and also by Michael Gray on the discographical data of record companies other than HMV (in this case, Columbia) and available on the CHARM database, tends to indicate that the term "British Symphony Orchestra" was little more than a cunning marketing ploy, and was used as a cover name for the orchestra of the Royal Philharmonic Society on at least a handful of recordings by Weingartner in 1931. Having a named ensemble rather a plain "Symphony Orchestra" on a record label or re-issue on CD can improve sales, since categorising things is a significant human activity.

"The British Symphony Orchestra" in this context appears to be simply a name used by Columbia for an ad hoc recording ensemble of musicians, or pickup orchestra, quite possibly the Royal Philharmonic Orchestra. Any connection with the old BSO from the 1920s appears tenuous at the very least and borders on improbability, although some of the musicians may have played in both. The British Symphony Orchestra appears to have led the same type of existence as the Columbia Symphony which made its first appearance in 1913.

Notes on the discography
The discography and following table are based on Michael Gray's database compiled from Columbia's own contemporary session logs and matrix notes, available on CHARM. This information often differs from the record labels, particularly the name of the ensemble.

In the database, a "British Symphony Orchestra" is only specified in three or four recordings. The orchestra of the Royal Philharmonic Society, which recorded as "The Royal Philharmonic Orchestra", is specified in the Weingartner recordings of 1931, released with "British Symphony Orchestra" on the label. In all the other recordings a plain "Symphony Orchestra" is given (apart from Weingartner's Beethoven 5th Symphony, where no orchestra or recording venue is specified at all).

Some sources (Altena et al.) attribute the Walter recordings of 1930 to a British Symphony Orchestra, even though the labels state "Symphony Orchestra". There seems to be little basis for this, except that they were made in the same year as the Smyth and Fried recordings. The recordings of the first two Sibelius symphonies by Robert Kajanus have been included in the table for comparison only, as have the 1930 Weingartner discs of the "Hammerklavier" sonata and a Strauss waltz.

Notes on Michael Gray's database on CHARM

Search terms should be in all lower-case only. All matrix numbers always have a space (eg wax 248), and all catalogue (or label) numbers never have a space (eg dx266). Searching for e.g. dx 266 as a catalogue number will return 0 results.

A .csv file (viewable with e.g. MS Excel) is created for each search, but it's a bit tricky to open. The default file name is generated with a session id, e.g. ax_270.csv;jsessionid=7EF92BCD186E2F3B86A31B36C0EC6F7D.balancer5. When you save the file you must either remove the semicolon and everything after it, to leave just eg ax_270.csv, or add .csv at the very end of the filename, eg ax_270.csv;jsessionid=7EF92BCD186E2F3B86A31B36C0EC6F7D.balancer5.csv.

Each search session completely expires after a fairly short period of inactivity (around 30 minutes), including the contents of the .csv file, so the results unfortunately can't be incorporated in any permanent web link. You will have to make the searches for yourself.  Dates are always returned in y-m-d format. Three typical results are given here. (Note that Ethel Smyth's name is misspelled in the database which, though generally accurate, has not been checked/ proofread).

Columbia recordings, matrix and catalogue numbers

A full Columbia electrically-recorded matrix number is typically given in this discography as e.g. [Mx] CAX 6048-2 On the record disc itself the initial "C" (or "W") is enclosed in a circle, ©AX. The -2 at the end indicates it was the second 'take' of that side, although Columbia (unlike HMV) didn't specify the actual take number on the record.  In some other discographies the takes are given in Roman numerals: e.g. WAX 6048-II. Matrix numbers are given in full where known. A sequence of matrix numbers (without take numbering) is shown as e.g. [Mx] WAX 6104/7. Catalogue (i.e. label) numbers are shown without spaces (as in Gray's database), e.g. HMV D521 or, as a sequence, Columbia (UK) LX144/5.

Having released a recording with a catalogue number, Columbia was in the infamous habit of issuing newer recordings with the same catalogue number a few years later, sometimes of completely different works, and/or composers & musicians. Thus two entirely different recordings may share the same label number, and matrix numbers are the key to identifying specific recordings.

Sometimes information printed on the record label is at variance with the printed record catalogues (e.g Wood's 1932 recording of two movements by Bach). The operations of Columbia in the UK and the US can lead to confusion. They used different catalogue numbers, and some recordings were only released in the US, e.g. Weingartner's Beethoven 5th symphony or Walter's Prometheus Overture (see below).

Acoustic Recordings 1919–1923

Raymond Roze
 Mozart: Overtures to The Magic Flute (heavily abridged) and  Le Nozze di Figaro. British Symphony Orchestra cond. Roze.
 c1919-20, Edison Bell Studios, Peckham. [Mx] X-1118/9. Velvet Face VF502.
 Nicolai: Overture to The Merry Wives of Windsor. British Symphony Orchestra cond. Roze.
 c1919-20, Edison Bell Studios, Peckham. [Mx] X-1120, X-1121-3. Velvet Face VF512.

Adrian Boult

HMV
Boult made a number of unissued takes with the BSO: these are listed along with the released recordings.

 Scarlatti-Tommasini: The Good-humoured Ladies. British Symphony Orchestra cond. Boult.
November 1920-July 1921 (3  sessions). Room 1, HMV, Hayes. HMV D521, D573.
 D521. Side 1: Nos. III, X, I. Rec. 5 November 1920. [Mx] HO 4598-2af. 
 Side 2: Nos. VI, VII, VIII. Rec. 16 November 1920. [Mx] HO 4617-2af
 D573. Side 3: Nos. XIII, XIV, XV, XVI. Rec. 21 July 1921. [Mx] Cc 382-2. 
 Side 4: Nos. XX XXI, XXII, XXIII. Rec. 5 November 1920. [Mx] HO 4595-2af
 Butterworth: Rhapsody, A Shropshire Lad. British Symphony Orchestra cond. Boult.
 16 November 1920, Room 1, HMV, Hayes. [Mx] HO 4618/9. HMV D520.
 Wagner: Siegfried Idyll. British Symphony Orchestra cond. Boult.
 6 December 1920, Room 1, HMV, Hayes. [Mx] HO 4645-1af HO 4646 af.
 (unissued?) Holst: Two Songs Without Words, Op 22, No. 1 - Country Song. British Symphony Orchestra cond. Boult.
 6 December 1920 [Mx]  HO 4647 af, HO 4648 af.
 Rossini-Respighi: La Boutique fantasque (selection). British Symphony Orchestra cond. Boult.
 2 June 1921, Room 1, HMV, Hayes. [Mx] Cc 210-1, Cc 211-3. HMV D572.
 Bliss: Rout. Stella Power (soprano),  British Symphony Orchestra cond. Boult.
 21 July 1921, Room 1, HMV, Hayes. [Mx] Cc 380-3, Cc 381-2. HMV D574.
 Humperdinck: Hansel and Gretel - Overture. British Symphony Orchestra cond. Boult.
 3 November 1921, Room 1, HMV, Hayes. [Mx] Cc 624-2, 625-2. HMV D591.
 (unissued?) Holst: Two songs without words, Op. 22, No. 2 - Marching Song. British Symphony Orchestra cond. Boult. 
 3 November 1921, Room 1, HMV, Hayes. [Mx] Cc 626-1, Cc 626-2.
 (unissued?) Wagner: Siegfried Idyll. British Symphony Orchestra cond. Boult.
 5 December 1921, Room 1, HMV, Hayes. [Mx] Cc 742-1/2, Cc 743-1/2, Cc 744-1/3 (7 takes).
 3 February 1922, Room 1, HMV, Hayes. [Mx] Cc 742-3, Cc 742-4, Cc 744-5, Cc 974-1/3 (6 takes)
 20 March 1922, Room 1, HMV, Hayes. [Mx] Cc 742-5/7,  Cc 974-4/6 (6 takes)
 Humperdinck: Hansel and Gretel - "Hexentritt" & "Traum". British Symphony Orchestra cond. Boult. 
 6 March 1922, Room 1, HMV, Hayes. [Mx] Cc 1069-3, Cc 1070-2. HMV D617.
 (unissued?) Butterworth: Two English Idylls - No 1. British Symphony Orchestra cond. Boult. 
20 March 1922, Room 1, HMV, Hayes. [Mx] Cc 1129-1.

Edison Bell Velvet Face
 Liszt: Piano Concerto No.1 in E flat. Anderson Tyrer (piano), British Symphony Orchestra cond. Boult.
c1922,  Edison Bell Studios, Peckham. [Mx] X-1241, X-1242, X-1243, X-1244. Velvet Face VF557/8.
 Schubert: "Unfinished" Symphony.  British Symphony Orchestra cond. Boult.
 c1922, Edison Bell Studios, Peckham. [Mx] unknown. Velvet Face VF540/2.
 VF540. 1st mvt, parts 1 & 2 
 VF541. 1st mvt, part 3, 2nd mvt, part 1
 VF542. 2nd mvt, parts 2 & 3 
 Offenbach: Orphee Aux Enfers, Overture. British Symphony Orchestra, conductor unknown.
 c1922, Edison Bell Studios, Peckham. [Mx] X-1304/5. Velvet Face VF566.
 Franck: Symphonic Variations. Anderson Tyrer (piano). British Symphony Orchestra cond. Boult.
 c1922, Edison Bell Studios, Peckham. [Mx] X-1398, X-1399, X-1400, X-1401. Velvet Face VF599-600.
 Tchaikovsky: The Nutcracker (excerpts). British Symphony Orchestra cond. Boult
 February 1923, Edison Bell Studios, Peckham. [Mx] 7542/5. Velvet Face VF1060 & VF1062 (10").
 VF1060. [Mx] 7542-1, 7544-1. 'Valse Des Fleurs'; "Danse Des Mirlitons" 
 VF1062. [Mx] 7543-1, 7545-1. 'March Of The Toys'; 'Danse Chinoise'; 'Danse Arabe'

Electrical recordings 1930-1932

Columbia released some fifteen recordings with "British Symphony Orchestra" on the label. A conductor's name in italics indicates that the immediately following recordings were not assigned to the British Symphony Orchestra by Columbia in any way. They are listed for comparison only. All the entries are listed in a sortable table following the main discography.

1930
Felix Weingartner

These are the last issued recordings of the "old" Royal Philharmonic Orchestra, the recording name of the orchestra of the Royal Philharmonic Society.

  Beethoven (orch. Weingartner): Hammerklavier Sonata, Op. 106. Orchestra of the RPS cond. Weingartner
 26 March 1930, Central Hall, Westminster. [Mx] WAX 5485/92. Columbia (UK) LX43/7.
 
  Josef Strauss: Sphärenklänge-Walzer, op. 235 (Music of the Spheres). Orchestra of the RPS cond. Weingartner.
 1 April 1930, Central Hall, Westminster. [Mx] WAX 5500/1. Columbia (UK) LX40.

Ethel Smyth

  Smyth: The Wreckers Overture. British Symphony Orchestra, cond Smyth.
 1 May 1930, Central Hall, Westminster. [Mx] WAX 5567/8. Columbia (UK) DX 287.

Bruno Walter

These three recordings were issued by Columbia with a plain "Symphony Orchestra" on the label. At least one source  assigns the British Symphony Orchestra as the ensemble, although neither Columbia's own data nor the label back this up.

  Wagner: Siegfried Idyll. "Symphony Orchestra", cond. Walter.
 16 May 1930, Central Hall, Westminster. [Mx] WAX 5584/7
 Columbia (US) "Masterworks" set X-26; Columbia (UK) LX 79/80.
  Wagner: Die Meistersinger von Nurnberg, Prelude to Act I.  "Symphony Orchestra", cond. Walter. 
 16 May 1930, Central Hall, Westminster. [Mx] WAX 5588/9. Columbia (UK) DX86 
  Beethoven: Prometheus Overture, Op. 43. "Symphony Orchestra", cond. Walter.
 16 May 1930, Central Hall, Westminster. [Mx] WAX 5590/1.  Columbia (US) 68091-D.

Robert Kajanus 
Although none of these recordings by an unnamed "Symphony Orchestra" have been attributed to the British Symphony Orchestra, Mark Obert-Thorn puts forward the view that the ensemble was the orchestra of the Royal Philharmonic Society, "the old RPO".

 Sibelius: Symphony No. 1. "Symphony Orchestra", cond. Kajanus
 21–23 May 1930, Central Hall, Westminster [Mx] WYX 1/WYX 9. Columbia (UK) LX65/69.
  Sibelius: Symphony No. 2. "Symphony Orchestra", cond. Kajanus
 27–28 May 1930, Central Hall, Westminster. [Mx] WYX 10/WYX 18. Columbia (UK) LX50/54.
  Sibelius: Karelia Suite - Intermezzo.  "Symphony Orchestra", cond. Kajanus
 28 May 1930, Central Hall, Westminster. [Mx] WYX 19. Columbia (UK) LX54 (last side of 2nd Sym.)
  Sibelius: Karelia Suite- Alla marcia. "Symphony Orchestra", cond. Kajanus
 28 May 1930, Central Hall, Westminster. [Mx] WYX 20. Columbia (UK) LX69 (last side of 1st Sym.)

Oskar Fried

  Délibes: Sylvia Ballet suite. British Symphony Orchestra cond. Fried.
 30 October 1930, Central Hall, Westminster. [Mx] WAX 5386/9. Columbia (UK) LX 114/5; Columbia (Germany) DWX 5002/3; Columbia (Italy) GQX 10560/1. 
 1. (a) Prélude. (b) Les Chasseresses. WAX 5836-2
 2. (a) Intermezzo (b) Valse Lente (L'escarpolette). WAX 5837-1
 3. (a) Pizzicati (b) Cortège de Bacchus, pt.1. WAX 5838-2
 4. Cortège, pt.2. WAX 5389-1

1931
Felix Weingartner
These three recordings were issued with "British Symphony Orchestra" on the label, but Columbia's matrix logs state just "Symphony Orchestra", and Michael Gray identifies the ensemble as the orchestra of the Royal Philharmonic Society.

  Leopold Mozart? Toy Symphony. "British Symphony Orchestra" cond. Weingartner.
 7 April 1931, Central Hall. [Mx] WAX 6046/7. Columbia (UK) DX311.
  Johann Strauss II: A Thousand and One Nights. "British Symphony Orchestra" cond. Weingartner.
 8 May 1931, Central Hall. [Mx] WAX 6048-2, WAX 6049-2. Columbia (UK) LX 133; (US) Set ML-4777; Nippon Columbia W78. 
  Johann Strauss II: Voices Of Spring, Op. 410. "British Symphony Orchestra", cond. Weingartner.
 8 May 1931, Central Hall. [Mx] WAX 6050/1. Columbia (UK) DX266; (US) Viva-Tonal J7897

Bruno Walter
  Mozart: Serenade for Strings, No. 13, K.525 (Eine kleine Nachtmusik). British Symphony Orchestra cond. Walter.
 21 May 1931, Central Hall. [Mx] WAX 6104/7. Columbia (UK) LX144/5; (US) Masterworks Set X-19 (68016/7-D, MX 70422/3-D)

  Wagner: Götterdämmerung, Act 3 - Siegfried's Funeral March. British Symphony Orchestra cond. Walter.
 22 May 1931, Central Hall, Westminster. [Mx] WAX 6108-2, WAX 6109-1. Columbia (US) 68044-D; Columbia (UK) LX156.

1932

Felix Weingartner
The recording of Beethoven's median symphony has been subject to considerable scrutiny.

 Beethoven: Symphony No. 5 in C minor, Op. 67. Unnamed orchestra cond. Weingartner.
 17–18 March 1932, unnamed location. [Mx] CAX 6348/6355. Columbia (US only) 68078-D through 68081-D, in Masterworks Set 178.
  Leo Delibes: Ballet, Naila - Waltz. Columbia Symphony and unnamed conductor.
 18 March 1932, unnamed location. [Mx] CAX 6358. Columbia: Unissued.

Bruno Walter
These five recordings all state "British Symphony Orchestra" on the label, although according to Michael Gray Columbia's own logs only specify the Marriage of Figaro overture as actually being played by the BSO: the other four have the usual plain "Symphony Orchestra".

  Wagner: Die Meistersinger von Nurnberg - Prelude to Act III. Symphony Orchestra (as BSO) cond. Walter.
 15 April 1932, Central Hall, Westminster. [Mx] CAX 6383-1, CAX 6384-1. Columbia (US) CX43; (UK) LX180.
  Wagner: Götterdämmerung: Siegfried's Rhine Journey. Symphony Orchestra (as BSO) cond. Walter.
 15 April 1932, Central Hall, Westminster. [Mx] CAX 6385-2, CAX 6386-2. Columbia (US) 68101-D; (UK) LX191; (JP) J8140.
  Mozart: Le nozze di Figaro, K.492 - Overture. British Symphony Orchestra cond. Walter.
 15 April 1932, Central Hall, Westminster. [Mx] CAX 6387-2. Columbia (UK) LX232; (US) 68133D.
 Beethoven: Violin Concerto in D, Op. 61. Joseph Szigeti (violin), Symphony Orchestra (as BSO) cond. Walter.
 18 April 1932, Central Hall, Westminster. [Mx] CAX 6388/97 (10 sides). Columbia (US) "Masterworks" set M-177; (UK) LX 174/8. 
  Wagner: Die Meistersinger von Nürnberg, Act III – Dance of the Apprentices. Symphony Orchestra (as BSO) cond. Walter. 
 19 April 1932, Central Hall, Westminster. [Mx] CAX 6398-2 (one side). Columbia (US) CX43 (Coupled with Beethoven's Prometheus Overture above); Columbia (UK) LX232 (Coupled with the Le nozze di Figaro overture above).

Henry Wood
The three final recordings listed here were all released with "British Symphony Orchestra" on the label, although the first pressings of the Bach arrangements unaccountably stated "London Symphony Orchestra" on the label. Wood's last previous recording was of Brandenburg 6 in June 1930. The final recording listed here was made about a week after Beecham's first concert with the LPO, formed out of the "old" RPO, the orchestra of the Royal Philharmonic Society, which has figured throughout this discography.

  Bach: Brandenburg Concerto No. 3 in G. British Symphony Orchestra cond. Wood.
 16 June 1932, Central Hall, Westminster. [Mx] CAX 6439-2, CAX 6440-1. Columbia (US) 68084-D; Columbia (UK) LX 173 (76.1rpm).
  Bach-Wilhemj: Orchestral Suite No. 3 in D, BWV 1068 - Air on the G String
 Bach-Wood: Unaccompanied Partita for Violin No. 3 in E, BWV 1006 - Gavotte.  British Symphony Orchestra cond. Wood.
 16 June 1932, unnamed location. [Mx] CAX 6441/2.  Columbia (UK) L1994, DX475
  Percy Grainger: Molly on the Shore and Mock Morris. British Symphony Orchestra cond. Wood.
 16 October 1932, Central Hall, Westminster. [Mx] CAX 6443-2, CAX 6444-1. Columbia (UK) LX 200.

Table of selected Columbia recordings 1930-1932

Matrix numbers are given without takes for clarity - see main text for more information where known. The "Refs" column refers back to the main discography to save duplication.

Digital recordings

Georges Delerue
The music for the film La Révolution française, directed by Robert Enrico and Richard T. Heffron in 1989, was composed and conducted by Georges Delerue. It was performed by the British Symphony Orchestra with chorus. This seems to have been an ensemble of freelance musicians from the Greater London area, recorded at HMV Abbey Road Studios in August 1989.

References
Notes

Citations

Bibliography

External links
These are almost all YouTube links.

1922
 The Good-Humoured Ladies at Jolyon
A Shropshire Lad

1923
 César Franck: Variations Symphoniques and Liszt: Piano Concerto No. 1

1930
 Hammerklavier Sonata
 Sphärenklänge-Walzer

 No Siegfried Idyll?
 Meistersinger Overture
 Beethoven: The Creatures of Prometheus Overture
 Fried: Delibes: Sylvia, ballet suite

1931

 Toy Symphony
 1001 Nights
 Voices of Spring
 Eine Kleine Nachtmusik, 1st mov. • 2nd mov. • 3rd mov. • 4th mov.
 Siegfried's funeral march - original
 Siegfried's funeral march - remastered

1932
 Beethoven Symphony No. 5
 Meistersinger - Prelude to Act III
 Siegfrieds Rheinfahrt
 Nozze di Figaro
 Beethoven Violin Concerto
 Meistersinger Dance of the Apprentices
 Brandenburg 3
 Air on the G string
 Bach Gavotte
 No Molly on the Shore?

1989
 La Révolution Française - complete soundtrack

2017
 Gordon Hendricks - If I Can Dream with the BSO cond. Philip Mackenzie in Suffolk, 2017, on YouTube

Discographies of British artists